Changhong may refer to:

Changhong, Chinese consumer electronics company
Changhong Technology, Chinese injection moulding company
Changhong Township, in Kaihua County, Zhejiang, China
Chang Hong (died 492 BC), scholar, politician, educator and astronomer in ancient China